Tim Giesen (born 26 July 1988) is a German former competitive ice dancer. With Stefanie Frohberg, he placed 11th at the 2010 World Junior Championships and competed at two Grand Prix events.

Career 
Giesen began learning to skate in 1995. Initially a single skater, he switched to ice dancing when he was eleven years old. He skated with Frauke Stein before teaming up with Saskia Brall. Brall/Giesen competed together for at least five seasons, appearing at three ISU Junior Grand Prix events. They were coached by Vitali Schulz and Rostislav Sinicyn in Dortmund.

In 2007, Giesen began a partnership with Jana Werner which lasted one season. He then skated one season with Christina Beier.

Giesen teamed up with Stefanie Frohberg in April 2009. They decided to train in Berlin, coached by René Lohse. Competing in the 2009–10 ISU Junior Grand Prix series, Frohberg/Giesen placed fourth in Lake Placid, New York, and then fifth in Dresden, Germany. After winning the national junior title, they were sent to the 2010 World Junior Championships in The Hague, Netherlands. They finished 11th after placing 9th in the compulsory dance, 15th in the original dance, and 11th in the free dance.

Frohberg/Giesen competed in the senior ranks in their second and final season together. They received two Grand Prix assignments; they placed eight at the 2010 Skate Canada International and then ninth at the 2010 Skate America. At the 2011 German Championships, they finished second, 27.41 points behind the champions, Nelli Zhiganshina / Alexander Gazsi. At the end of the season, Giesen retired from competitive skating in order to focus on his university studies.

Programs

With Frohberg

With Brall

Competitive highlights

With Frohberg

With Beier

With Werner

With Brall

References

External links

 

German male ice dancers
1988 births
Living people
Sportspeople from Wuppertal